The 2007 Dodge Avenger 500,  the 51st running of the race that traces its lineage to the 1957 Rebel 300, was the eleventh race of the 2007 NASCAR Nextel Cup Series, held at Darlington Raceway in Darlington, South Carolina, a suburb of Florence.

The race was postponed by rain, and was run the following afternoon, May 13 (Mother's Day in the US), the second race in two weeks to be rained out. Coincidentally, the first running of this event in 1957 was postponed by rain and delayed a day later to May 12, exactly 50 years to the originally scheduled date of this race.  Originally the third night race on the schedule, this also served as the fifth race to use the Car of Tomorrow template.

Chevrolet continued to dominate the NASCAR Cup Series like it did during the 1990s and through most of the 2000s. Michael Waltrip continued to have a negative number of points in this race due to his major penalty that was not mitigated until late into the 2007 NASCAR Nextel Cup Series season. Spanish-speaking NASCAR fans started to notice Jeff Gordon's dominance in this NASCAR event, making him a close second favorite to Juan Pablo Montoya.

Last chance for the All-Star Challenge
The race served as the final chance for teams and drivers who have not qualified for the Nextel All-Star Challenge to automatically enter that race by winning on the 1.366 mile egg-shaped oval known as "The Lady in Black" and "The Track Too Tough To Tame". If not, they would have to race in the NEXTEL Open race, as either one of the top two drivers or chosen in a fan vote.

Abrasive surface
The Darlington asphalt has been known to be one of the most abrasive in NASCAR, as the sandpaper-like surface shreds tires limiting their run on the track. This situation was rectified later in 2007 when the entire track was resurfaced. As a result, pit row became a concrete surface.

Qualifying
Clint Bowyer won the pole position, the first career pole in the Cup series for the driver of the #07 Chevrolet Impala. Greg Biffle, who had won the two previous Darlington races, sat on the outside of Bowyer. Michael Waltrip missed his 10th straight race, while Ken Schrader returned to the field after sitting out the two previous weeks.

Race recap
Jeff Gordon overcame a radiator problem to win the Dodge Avenger 500. The win was his third in the last four races, his sixth win in the Southern 500, and his 78th overall career. Because of the failure, his car emitted steam for the last 50 laps or so of the race. The race was arguably decided most in the pits. Gordon's crew chief, Steve Letarte, kept the #24 Chevy on the track during what would be the final caution of the race, while all other leaders came in for service. Meanwhile, Denny Hamlin was in position for a weekend sweep (he had won on Friday night in the Busch Series Diamond Hill Plywood 200), but a failure to apply lug nuts correctly on the first attempt led to a long pit stop, after which he never regained the lead. Hamlin still led the most laps on this day and finished second.

The remaining top drivers were in this order: Jimmie Johnson, Ryan Newman, Carl Edwards, Tony Stewart, Matt Kenseth, Dale Earnhardt Jr., Bowyer, and Jeff Burton.

After this race, Gordon led Jimmie Johnson by 231 points for the lead. Earnhardt Jr. led Jamie McMurray by 46 points for the 12th and final position in the Chase for the NEXTEL Cup. However, because of illegal bolts supporting the wing that was discovered in a pre-race inspection, Earnhardt was docked 100 driver points, the team lost 100 owner points and slapped with a $100,000 (US) fine and crew chief Tony Eury, Sr. was suspended until July 4. Because of the penalties, McMurray was elevated to the final Chase position as a result.

Race results
(*) denotes Rookie of the Year candidate.

Notes
 The last NASCAR race to be staged on Mother's Day before this one was the Winston (now the NASCAR NEXTEL All-Star Challenge) on May 15, 1986. Bill Elliott was the winner of the exhibition race.
 The race was postponed and moved to Sunday, in violation of South Carolina blue laws, with track president Bob Colvin was fined for the violation.  Current blue laws state Sunday racing is legal in South Carolina provided (1) a race is scheduled for more than 250 miles (402 km), or (2) it starts after 1:30 PM.

References

External links
 Complete results 
 Points standings after this race 
 Weather information

Dodge Avenger 500
Dodge Avenger 500
NASCAR races at Darlington Raceway
May 2007 sports events in the United States